The 42nd Virginia Infantry Regiment was an infantry regiment raised in Virginia for service in the Confederate States Army during the American Civil War. It fought mostly with the Army of Northern Virginia.

History
The 42nd Virginia, organized at Staunton, Virginia, in July 1861, recruited its members in Henry, Floyd, Bedford, Campbell, Roanoke, Patrick, and Franklin counties.

After fighting at First Kernstown and in Jackson's Valley Campaign, the unit was assigned to J.R. Jones' and W. Terry's Brigade, Army of Northern Virginia. It was active in many conflicts from the Seven Days' Battles to Cold Harbor, then moved with Early to the Shenandoah Valley and was involved in the Appomattox operations. This regiment reported 70 casualties at First Kernstown and totaled 750 effectives in May 1862. It sustained no losses during the Seven Days' Battles but had many at Cedar Mountain. There were 62 disabled at Second Manassas, 26 at Fredericksburg, and 135 at Chancellorsville. Of the 265 engaged at Gettysburg, twenty-one percent were killed, wounded, or missing. Only 1 officer and 44 men surrendered.

Field officers
The field officers were Colonels Jesse S. Burks, Andrew J. Deyerle, John E. Penn, and R. W. Withers; Lieutenant Colonels Daniel A. Langhorne, William Martin, and Samuel H. Saunders; and Majors P. B. Adams, Henry Lane, and Jesse M. Richardson.

See also

List of Virginia Civil War units

Further reading
 Anthony family, B. H. Anthony, Callie J. Anthony, John W. Anthony, J. G. Harden, and Robert E. Lee. Letters of the Anthony Family. 1861. Contents: The letters to Callie J. Anthony, Arnoldton, Campbell County, Va., from her brothers B.H. Anthony and John W. Anthony, and from her cousin J.G. Harden discuss family news and Confederate camp life. Of interest are two letters discussing the vote on the proposed "negro bill" to enlist African Americans in the Confederate Army. http://www.worldcat.org/oclc/32136583
 Chapla, John D. 42nd Virginia Infantry. Lynchburg, Va: H.E. Howard, 1983.
 Franklin, Thomas, and Robert Lemmon. Letters of the Leftwich Family. 1843. Abstract: The letters chiefly Convey family nes. Other topics include the sale of slaves, 1849; names and locations of family slaves hired out, some to a railroad near Abingdon, Va., 1856; the retreat from Harper's Ferry, where a relative was taken prisoner, 1862; army life and the war around Richmond, November 1862; and possible future of the 42nd Virginia Regiment, Second Brigade, Trimble's Division, May 15, 1863. Lt. Robert Lemmon of the 42nd Regiment and Thomas Franklin, [of the 2nd Regiment?] are correspondents. http://www.worldcat.org/oclc/48759594
 Hammond, Wesley A. Civil War Diary of Wesley A. Hammond. 1861. Company E, 43nd Virginia. Contents: The diary covers his military service in western Virginia between August 1861 and January 1862 and in northern and central Virginia between August and October 1862. He writes brief entries about war news and rumors from elsewhere, marches, weather, camp life, books read, religious sentiment, and hospital in Lynchburg. Lists the killed and wounded from Battles of Kernstown and Cedar Run. Of interest is brief mention of hearing cannonading on July 21, 1861, while near Buffalo Gap, Va., (possibly from the First Battle of Bull Run). Hammond was apparently on sick leave during the Valley Campaign and the Seven Days' Battle and, after return to service in August 1862, did not participate in the Battles of Cedar Run, Second Bull Run, and Antietam during the summer of 1862, though he does mention hearing of severe fighting at the latter two battles. http://www.worldcat.org/oclc/647845305
 McDermed, Edward, R. F. Kefauver, Oliver H. P. McDermed, and Charles Lewis Anthony. McDermed Papers. 1842. Summary: Chiefly letters, 1851-1882, to Edward McDermed, Gish's Mill, constable of Roanoke County, Va., concerning his mercantile business and his application for the railroad mail service. Also includes correspondence, 1861-1865, of Confederate soldiers, including R.F. Kefauver (of the 42nd Regiment), Oliver H.P. McDermed, Charles Lewis Anthony stationed at Jamestown Island, and an unidentified soldier. Subjects of the Civil War letters include the Peninsular Campaign and operations under Jubal A. Early in the Shenandoah Valley. http://www.worldcat.org/oclc/22877266
 McCauley, John, et al. Papers of John McCauley. 1826. Contents: Civil War items include correspondence of William McCauley of the 42nd Virginia; a postwar roster of Co. E. of the 42nd Virginia (Dixie Greys); three orders to Col. H.L. Gittner from Col. D Howard Smith at John H. Morgan's Division Cavalry Headquarters concerning patrolling of roads; a draft of a telegram announcing the death of Morgan; General Orders #11, December 16, 1863, from General James Longstreet concerning the contents of a captured Union letter in the hand and signed by Moxley Sorrel; and an order book containing copies of orders sent by Robert Ransom, Jr., 1863 November 3 to 1864 July 12. http://www.worldcat.org/oclc/647952225
 United States. Compiled Service Records of Confederate Soldiers Who Served in Organizations from the State of Virginia. Washington [D.C.]: National Archives, National Archives and Records Service, 1980. Roll 875. Forty-Second Infantry, O-Sh. http://www.worldcat.org/oclc/51588476
 Wright, Allen W. Company "I", "The Campbell Guard", 42nd Virginia Volunteer Infantry, Jones's Brigade, Jackson's Division, C.S.A. Salt Lake City, Utah: Filmed by the Genealogical Society of Utah, 1969.

References

External links
42nd Virginia Infantry Regiment, The Civil War in the East

Units and formations of the Confederate States Army from Virginia
1861 establishments in Virginia
Military units and formations established in 1861
1865 disestablishments in Virginia
Military units and formations disestablished in 1865